Tannoura Maxi - Taking Away the Community's Virginity - is a Lebanese movie, directed by Joe Bou Eid. It has been released on May 3rd, 2012.
The movie participated in more than 20 international film festival, and won 11 awards.

Starring
 Joy Karam
 Chady El Tineh
 Carole Abboud 
 Tamara Abou Jaoudeh 
 Siham Haddad 
 Antoine Balabane 
 Joseph Sessin 
 Nawal Kamel 
 Dory Moukarzel 
 Sarah Haidar 
 Daniel Balaban 
 Diamand Bou Abboud 
 Andree Nakkouzi 
 Rita Choueiri

External links

Lebanese drama films
2012 films